You Can't Tell Him is a 1971 Taiwanese drama film directed by Sung Tsun-shou, based on Chiung Yao's 1969 novel. The film stars Gua Ah-leh and Peter Yang.

Gua Ah-leh also sang the theme song, composed by Liu Chia-chang with lyrics by Chiung Yao. (The song was later covered by many artists, like Tsai Chin and Fei Yu-ching.

Cast
Gua Ah-leh as Fang Ssu-ying (real identity: Chang Han-yen)
Peter Yang as Po Pei-wen
Lee Hsiang as Ai-ling, Po Pei-wen's wife
Wang Jung as Kao Li-teh
Fuh Bih-huei as Po Pei-wen's mother
Wu Feng-feng as Ting-ting, Po Pei-wen's daughter

Awards and nominations
1971 Golden Horse Awards
Won—Best Supporting Actor (Wang Jung)
Nominated—Best Film

External links

Taiwanese romantic drama films
Films based on works by Chiung Yao
Films set in Taiwan
Films shot in Taiwan
Films directed by Sung Tsun-shou
1971 romantic drama films
1971 films